Israel González (born 4 December 1996) is a Mexican professional boxer who has challenged three times for super flyweight world titles; the WBA and IBF titles in 2018; and the WBA (Super) title in October 2020.

Professional boxing record

References

External links 
 

Living people
1996 births
Mexican male boxers
Super-flyweight boxers
Flyweight boxers
People from Cabo San Lucas
Boxers from Baja California Sur